Yvette Estermann (née Gavlasová; born February 26, 1967) is a Slowakian-born Swiss politician and member of the National Council from the Canton of Lucerne.

Early life and education 
Estermann was born in Bratislava, Czechoslovakia (now Slovakia) to Zdeno Gavlas (1932-2008) and Alžbeta Gavlasová (b. 1941). Her father was an insurance agent and freelance spiritual healer while her mother was a homemaker. 

She studied medicine at the Comenius University, where she obtained her doctorate in 1993. One year later, she emigrated to Switzerland to marry her Swiss partner and pursue studies in homeopathic medicine. After ceasing to practice medicine due to the time demands of her political office, she now works as a life coaching consultant. Estermann lives in Kriens with her son and husband.

Career 
After obtaining Swiss citizenship in 1999, Estermann joined the right-wing Swiss People's Party (SVP). In 2005, she was elected to the cantonal parliament, the Grand Council of Lucerne, and in the 2007 national elections, she was elected to the National Council. Despite her foreign origin, Estermann is very vocal against immigration of foreigners into Switzerland

Estermann was member of the board of Cosmos AG, the business which ran the Swiss degree mill "Free University of Teufen". She also did her doctorate at the university, which raised doubts about her doctorate.

She's a member of a Campaign for an Independent and Neutral Switzerland.

Family 
She is married to Richard F. Estermann (b. 1942), an independent consultant (Estermann Consulting) with whom she has one son, Richard Estermann, Jr. (b. 1995). She resides in Kriens, Lucerne, Switzerland.

References

External links
Personal website
Personal blog
Personal newssite
Personal video-website

1967 births
Living people
Politicians from Bratislava
Slovak emigrants to Switzerland
Swiss People's Party politicians
Members of the National Council (Switzerland)
Women members of the National Council (Switzerland)
Campaign for an Independent and Neutral Switzerland
People from the canton of Lucerne
Life coaches
21st-century Swiss women politicians
21st-century Swiss politicians
20th-century Slovak physicians